The Slender clingfish(Gastrocyathus gracilis) is a clingfish of the family Gobiesocidae, the only species in the genus Gastrocyathus.  This species grows to a length of  TL.  Endemic to New Zealand, this species is apparently only found in beds of strap-fronded algae.  Harpacticoid copepods comprise the main component of their diet.

References
 

Gobiesocidae
Endemic marine fish of New Zealand
Monotypic fish genera
Fish described in 1955